White Hill is a semi-rural locality approximately  west of the centre of Murray Bridge by road. It is named for the geographical feature of the same name, part of the Gifford Hills Range, which runs parallel to the Murray River on the western side of Murray Bridge, from Gifford Hill to Rocky Gully and Kinchina Conservation Park.

Large parts of Kinchina Conservation Park and Monarto Woodlands Conservation Park are within the locality.

References 

Towns in South Australia